Allianz Riviera (also known as the Stade de Nice due to UEFA and FIFA sponsorship regulations) is a multi-use stadium in Nice, France, used mostly for football matches of host OGC Nice and also for occasional home matches of rugby union club Toulon. The stadium has a capacity of 36,178 people and replaces the city's former stadium Stade Municipal du Ray. Construction started in 2011 and was completed two years later. The stadium's opening was on 22 September 2013, for a match between OGC Nice and Valenciennes.

The stadium was originally planned to be completed by 2007. However, construction was halted the previous year because of concerns related to the future cost of the structure. Plans for the stadium, located in Saint-Isidore near the Var, were then shelved. The project was revived as part of France's ultimately successful bid to host UEFA Euro 2016.  Due to sponsorship regulations, the stadium is known as the Stade de Nice in UEFA competition. The stadium hosted six matches at the 2019 FIFA Women's World Cup.

UEFA Euro 2016 matches

The stadium was one of the venues of the UEFA Euro 2016 and hosted the following matches:

2019 FIFA Women's World Cup matches

The stadium was one of the venues of the 2019 FIFA Women's World Cup. It hosted 4 group games, one round of 16 match, and the third-place playoff.
These were the matches it hosted:

2023 Rugby World Cup
The stadium is one of the venues of the 2023 Rugby World Cup:

Concerts

Gallery

References

External links

Allianz Riviera website 

Football venues in France
Sports venues in Nice
Sports venues completed in 2013
OGC Nice
UEFA Euro 2016 stadiums
2019 FIFA Women's World Cup stadiums
Olympic football venues
Venues of the 2024 Summer Olympics
21st-century architecture in France